Jokerman: Tommy Tiernan in America is the fourth DVD release from Tommy Tiernan and was filmed over a 2-year period. It follows Tommy's attempt to be successful in America. It was filmed in comedy clubs in New York City, Washington, D.C., and other places from Omaha to Sacramento. Material for the gigs was obtained from the various experiences he encountered, both good and bad, and the different people and cultures that he came across over the two-year period.

DVD track list 
Lonely in New York
Clubtown California
Montreal
You don't need to curse in order to be funny
Vastland
I love guns
Where'd everyone go ?
The late show

Bonus features 
Irish gala 2006 (Filmed at Just for Laughs, The Montreal Comedy Festival)
Full New York club gig
10 years of Tommy on the late late show
weblink

External links
https://web.archive.org/web/20071119065732/http://www.tommytiernan.com/

Stand-up comedy on DVD
2000s in comedy